Mozambique competed at the 2007 All-Africa Games held in Algiers, Algeria. The country won one gold medal.

Medal summary

Medal table

Athletics 

Mozambique won one gold medal in athletics. Leonor Piuza won the gold medal in the women's 800 metres event.

Basketball 

Mozambique competed in the women's tournament.

Judo 

Edson Madeira competed in the men's 66 kg event.

References 

Nations at the 2007 All-Africa Games
2007
All-Africa Games